Paula Malia (born 26 September 1990) is a Spanish actress and singer. She became popular for her role as Carmen in Netflix series Valeria.

Filmography

Films
 In Family I Trust
 Crazy About Her

Television 
 If I Hadn't Met You
 Valeria

The Mamzelles 
In 2010 Paula Ribó, together with Paula Malia and Bàrbara Mestanza, founded the music group The Mamzelles. The band released two albums Que se desnude otra (2012) and Totem (2014). In 2012, they created a theatre company, The Mamzelles Teatre.

External links

References 

Spanish film actresses
Spanish television actresses
21st-century Spanish actresses
Actresses from Catalonia
1990 births
Living people